The Papuan hawk-owl (Uroglaux dimorpha) is a medium-sized, sleek owl with a proportionately small head, long tail, and short, rounded wings. Its white facial disk is small and indistinct, with black streaks, and white eyebrows. It has buff-colored upperparts and barred black and brown underparts. Its eyes are bright yellow, and it has a gray to black bill. The male is larger than the female, which is unusual among owls.

It is probably a resident species in its restricted range, New Guinea.

Not much is known about the status of this species, as insufficient data exist to quantify its population. It is rarely seen, and may be threatened due to deforestation.

References

Papuan hawk-owl
Birds of prey of New Guinea
Papuan hawk-owl
Papuan hawk-owl